Tarentaise may refer to the following:

Places in France
 Moûtiers, historically known as Tarentaise, in Savoy
 Province of Tarentaise
 Tarentaise Valley
 Tarentaise, Loire

Other uses
 Roman Catholic Ancient Diocese of Tarentaise, France
 Tarentaise cattle

See also
 Cardinal of Tarentaise (disambiguation)
 Peter of Tarentaise (disambiguation)